This is a list of children's animated television series (including internet television series); that is, animated programs originally targeted towards audiences aged 12 and under in mind.

This list does not include Japanese, Chinese, or Korean series, as children's animation is much more common in these regions.

1990s

United States

United Kingdom

Canada

Co-productions

European

Canadian

References

1990s animated television series
animated
Childrens 1990s
1990s television-related lists
 1990s